Ram Kamal Mukherjee (born 13 September 1976) is the former editor in chief of Stardust film magazine, noted Indian film journalist, biographer of Hema Malini and Sanjay Dutt. He made his debut as filmmaker with Cakewalk starring Esha Deol. He has been regarded as one of the best Indian short filmmaker by Times of India.

Personal information
Ram Kamal Mukherjee completed his graduation in History from the University of Calcutta. He completed his schooling from St Joseph's College in Calcutta, and later completed his senior schooling from Khalsa Model School. After graduation he completed a diploma course in communication from the British Council, later joined Media Studies Film and Television course in University of Calcutta.

Career
Mukherjee is best known as a biographer of Hema Malini's authorized biography Beyond The Dreamgirl and India's first Power Brand Film Journalist. After working with Times of India (Mumbai Mirror) as assistant editor, he worked with Pritish Nandy Communication as vice president and wrote columns in Midday and Ananda Bazar Patrika. Later he worked as Associate Producer in Zee TV finite series Bin Kuch Kahe.

He is best known for writing India's first coffee table book on any actress, Hema Malini - Diva Unveiled, which was published by Magna Books in 2005.

In 2019 he made his debut as filmmaker with Cakewalk starring Esha Deol in the lead role. In 2020 his film Season's Greetings, a tribute to Rituparno Ghosh fetched him national and international accolades. The film also marked return of former Miss India Celina Jaitly Haag into cinema. In 2021 he won the Best Human Rights Film at Cardiff International Film Festival for his film Rickshawala. 
As an author he penned six books, in English and Hindi languages. His biography Beyond The Dreamgirl published by Harper Collins India, was released by Deepika Padukone in Mumbai. The foreword of the book was written by Prime Minister of India Mr Narendra Modi.

He had also penned biography of Sanjay Dutt - One Man Many Lives published by Rupa Books.

Bibliography

Filmography 

He was also producer of Bin Kuch Kahe TV series on Zee TV.

Awards

For writing

As director

References

External links
 
 
 
 
 Official Website

Indian male journalists
Indian film critics
20th-century Indian biographers
1976 births
Living people
Writers from Kolkata
University of Calcutta alumni
Indian film historians
English-language writers from India
Bengali people
20th-century Indian male writers
Male biographers